Adventist University of France also called in French: Campus Adventiste du Salève, formerly named Salève Adventist University, belongs to the Seventh-day Adventist Church and is affiliated with Partnership of Adventist Colleges in Europe, (PACE). The university is located about five miles from Geneva across the Swiss-French border. This mountain with its restaurants and breath-taking view of the Rhône valley or Mont Blanc attracts many from nearby Geneva. From the campus, the city of Geneva and the Lake Geneva make a picturesque view. On the same campus are located schools from kindergarten to senior high school levels.

Collonges-sous-Salève, the village where the campus is located, is situated in the French département of Haute-Savoie, named "Upper Savoy" for its location in the foothills of the Alps mountain range.

History
The first Adventist seminary in Europe was established in 1893 in Switzerland. This was transferred to Collonges-sous-Salève in 1921, and took the name of Séminaire adventiste du Salève (Adventist Seminary of the Saleve). Being the first European Adventist seminary, it contributed to the training of hundreds of pastors in Europe and has sent missionaries around the world. From 1955, the institution offered a 4-years training program and now 5 years: 3 for a bachelor and 2 for a master. Actually the name is campus adventiste du Salève or Collonges Adventist University.

Academic divisions 
The Adventist Theological Seminary is the main teaching faculty at Saleve Adventist University. The French Language Institute is a department of the university that teaches student the French language and culture.

The university also offers distance learning courses.

Alfred Vaucher Library 
The Alfred Vaucher Library is a resource centre serving:
 The Adventist Theological Seminary
 The French Language Institute
 Maurice-Tièche primary and Comprehensive School

The Library catalogue also integrates the books of four research collections:
 A research centre of the Ellen G. White Estate
 The Historical Files of Adventism in Europe
 The José Figols Research Center
 The Public Affairs and Religious Liberty Centre

See also 

 List of Seventh-day Adventist colleges and universities
 Maurice-Tièche Comprehensive School

References

External links 
 Official website
 Bibliothèque Alfred Vaucher

Universities and colleges affiliated with the Seventh-day Adventist Church
Ellen G. White Estate